Thys is a Dutch patronymic surname. It is an alternative spelling of Thijs, a very common nickname for Matthijs (Mattheus). The Dutch digraph ij and the y ("ij" without dots) were used interchangeably until the surname spelling fixations around 1810. The form "Thys" is particularly common in the Belgian province of Antwerp, while "Thijs" is most common in Belgian Limburg. Outside the Low Countries the spelling is almost exclusively "Thys." People with this surname include:

Surname
Albert Thys (1849–1915), Belgian businessman active in the Congo Free State
Albert Thys (1894–1976), painter
Alphonse Thys (1807–1879), French composer
Antoine Thys (Antonius Thysius) (1565–1640), Dutch theologian
Edith Thys (born 1966), American alpine skier
Gert Thys (born 1971), South African long-distance runner
Guy Thys (1922–2003), Belgian footballer and football coach
Guy Lee Thys (born 1952), Belgian film producer, director, and screenwriter
Gysbrecht Thys (1617–1684), Flemish painter
Ivan Thys (1897–1982), Belgian footballer
Jeffrey Thys (born 1988), Belgian field hockey player
Nicolas Thys (born 1968), Belgian bassist
Pauline Thys (c.1836–1909), French composer and librettist
Philippe Thys (1889–1971), Belgian cyclist; three times winner of the Tour de France
Thierry Thys (1931–2009), American aerospace engineer and pilot

See also
Thijs, given name, nickname and surname
Tijs, an ever shorter Dutch form of Matthew

References

Dutch-language surnames
Surnames of Belgian origin
Patronymic surnames
Surnames from given names